Alfons Sweeck (15 March 1936 – 13 December 2019) was a Belgian professional cyclist from 1959 to 1962.

He was the grandfather of fellow cyclists Laurens, Diether and Hendrik Sweeck.

Sweeck won a stage of the 1960 Vuelta a España and the general classification of the 1960 Tour of Belgium.

Major results
1957
 5th Ronde van Vlaanderen Beloften
1958
 3rd Overall Milk Race
1st Stages 3 & 5a (ITT)
1959
 1st Stage 3b Tour of Belgium
 1st Stage 6 Tour de Tunisie
 9th Grand Prix des Nations
1960
 1st  Overall Tour of Belgium
 1st Stage 10 Vuelta a España

References

1936 births
2019 deaths
Cyclists from Flemish Brabant
Belgian male cyclists
Belgian Vuelta a España stage winners
People from Keerbergen